Therapy is the debut EP of Diatribe, released in 1991 by Eight One Nine Productions. It was reissued by COP International later that year.

Music
Diatribe's Therapy EP was originally released in 1991 by Eight One Nine Productions. The music came to the attention of Christian Petke, vocalist and founding member of Deathline International, and he decided to use Diatribe and Battery as premier band's for his label COP International. "Cockeyed Motherfucker" was first released on the 1990 various artists compilations From the Machine by Index Productions and A Reason for Living by Santa Cruz Skateboards. The songs "Tantau" and "Needle Park" were released on COP Intl.'s California Cyber Crash Compilation and If It Moves...'s The Cyberflesh Conspiracy in 1992. The artwork for the release was accidentally switched with Meat Market by Diatribe when it was reissued on COP International in 1992.

Track listing

Personnel
Adapted from the Therapy liner notes.

Diatribe
 Marc Jameson – lead vocals, keyboards, drums, programming, production, engineering
 Kevin Marburg – bass guitar, sampler, cover art, design
 Vince Montalbano – electric guitar
 Pat Toves – electric guitar

Release history

References

External links 
 

Diatribe (band) albums
1991 debut EPs
COP International EPs